Forest Park Jr./Sr. High School is a 7–12 grade public learning institution located in Ferdinand, Indiana. It serves the Southeast Dubois County School Corporation.

Academics

A North Central Association accredited school since 1979, Forest Park offers fifteen dual credit courses to its students in various areas of study.  Three of these classes are also presented as Advanced Placement courses:  AP Calculus AB, AP Chemistry, and AP Biology.

Athletics and clubs

Athletics
The boys basketball program won back to back state championships (2004–05 & 2005–06); they were also state finalists in 2002-03 & 2017-18.  The girls softball team took the state title for the 2000–2001 season. The girls basketball team won the 2A state championship in 2022 and 2023.

Marching Band
Forest Park's marching band, known as the Marching Rangers, has won 11 state championships since 1973 (1981, 1982, 1985, 1986, 2001, 2008, 2012, 2013, 2014, 2015 and 2018).

Notable alumni
 Ben Braunecker - National Football League (NFL) tight end

See also
 List of high schools in Indiana

References

External links
 Forest Park HS Homepage
 School district website

Blue Chip Conference
Schools in Dubois County, Indiana
Public high schools in Indiana
High schools in Southwestern Indiana
Pocket Athletic Conference
Public middle schools in Indiana